Vollugi is a surname. Notable people with the surname include:

Ernie Vollugi (1879–1964), Australian rules footballer
Herc Vollugi (1880–1960), Australian rules footballer